Chalk is a BBC Television sitcom. The show was produced by Andre Ptaszynski for the independent production company Pola Jones and screened on BBC2. All twelve episodes from the two series were written by Steven Moffat and directed by Juliet May. The first episode of the series was transmitted on 20 February 1997, and the final transmitted on 22 October 1997.

The series focuses upon deputy headteacher Eric Slatt (David Bamber), permanently stressed over the chaos he creates both by himself and some of his eccentric staff. His wife Janet (Geraldine Fitzgerald) and new English teacher Suzy Travis (Nicola Walker) attempt to help him solve the problems.

Due to the positive reaction of the studio audience during recordings, a second series was commissioned before the first had aired. However, the first series attracted criticism, inflamed by the BBC's decision to compare the show to the highly respected Fawlty Towers in its publicity materials. The first series was released on DVD in December 2008.

Series overview

Episodes

Series 1 (1997)
The first series was broadcast on BBC1 on Thursday evenings between 20 February and 27 March 1997. The first four episodes were transmitted at 21:30, but the final two episodes of the second series were moved to 22:20.

Series 2 (1997)
Due to the positive reaction of the studio audience during recordings, a second series was commissioned before the first had started to be transmitted. The second series was broadcast on BBC1 on Wednesday evenings between 17 September and  22 October 1997, mostly at 10:15pm.

As John Wells was too ill to film the second series, Duncan Preston played Galfast High's new headmaster, Mr Kennedy, who appeared almost identical in character to Wells' Mr Nixon.

References

External links

BBC-related lists
Lists of British sitcom episodes
Television episodes written by Steven Moffat